Ebbw Vale Football Club was a football club from Ebbw Vale, South Wales.

History
Ebbw Vale played in the first season of the League of Wales in 1992–93. The club then finished 11th before finishing 3rd in two successive seasons to 1997–98. During the years when they finished 3rd the Giles brothers, Paul and David were key members of the team. The manager at the time was John Lewis.

They competed in the 1997 UEFA Intertoto Cup where they played Bastia, GAK, Hrvatski Dragovoljac, and Silkeborg. However, they were expelled from the League of Wales before the 1998–99 season began, and promptly went out of business. They played their last game against Kongsvinger in the 1998 UEFA Intertoto Cup.

A phoenix club Ebbw Vale Town F.C. was formed in 2007, and played in the North Gwent League until May 2018 when they folded.

Honours

Southern Football League
Champions (1): 1922–23
Welsh Section Champions (2): 1921–22, 1922–23
Welsh Football League
Champions (2): 1952–53, 1987–88
Welsh Cup
Winners (1): 1925–26
Welsh League Cup
Runner-up (1): 1996
Welsh Football League Cup
Winners (3): 1927, 1956, 1957
Runner-up (1): 1929

Founding Members of: South Wales Senior League, Rhymney Valley League and League of Wales

European record

Notable former players
Capped players
  David Giles
  Gary Plumley
  Jimmy Rollo

References

External links
Full history from welsh-premier.com

Defunct football clubs in Wales
Southern Football League clubs
Association football clubs established in 1888
Association football clubs disestablished in 1998
1888 establishments in Wales
1998 disestablishments in Wales
Ebbw Vale
Cymru Premier clubs
Welsh Football League clubs
South Wales League clubs